Andrés Ismael Cunha Soca (born 8 September 1976) is an international football referee from Montevideo, Uruguay.

Career
He has been a FIFA-listed referee since 2013 and has refereed a number of major matches in Copa Libertadores and Copa América. Cunha has also refereed matches in the 2017 FIFA U-20 World Cup in the Korea Republic. During international matches, his assistant referees are Nicolás Taran and Mauricio Espinosa. At the domestic level, Cunha regularly referees matches in the Uruguayan Primera División.

Cunha officiated the 2018 FIFA World Cup match between France and Australia on 16 June, where he awarded a penalty kick after consultation with Mauro Vigliano, the video assistant referee. The incident marked the first time a penalty had been awarded after consultation with the VAR in a World Cup match.

FIFA World Cup

Notes

References

External links 
 
 
 

Living people
Uruguayan football referees
Copa América referees
1976 births
Uruguayan people of Portuguese descent
2018 FIFA World Cup referees